Lykourgos-Stefanos Tsakonas (born 8 March 1990) is a former Greek sprinter, specializing in 200 metres.

Biography
Born in Sparta, he made his first international appearance at the 2007 World Youth Championships in Athletics. He participated in the 400 meters event and was eliminated in the first round. In 200 meters he was much more competitive, proving his specialty in the event. He set a personal best of 21.49 seconds to reach the final, in which eventually he failed to finish the race.

In 2008 he improved his personal best to 21.20 seconds at Athens Olympic Stadium and later competed at the 2008 World Junior Championships in Athletics where he reached the 200 m semi-finals. At the 2009 European Team Championships he took the fifth place, while at the 2009 European Athletics Junior Championships he managed to run under 21 seconds for the first time (20.94 s), taking the fourth place. He also represented Greece at the 2009 Mediterranean Games, taking the eighth place.

At the beginning of 2010, he was second at the Greek national indoor championship in 60 metres, setting a personal best of 6.76 seconds. He made an impressive progression in the summer season as well: in 200 meters he ran 20.77 s at the Papaflessia meeting, he won the 200 m national title and later took the second place at the 2010 European Team Championships with a performance of 20.69 seconds. At his first major senior competition, the 2010 European Athletics Championships in Barcelona, he entered the final and finished in the seventh place. At the 2011 European Athletics U23 Championships he won the gold medal, setting a Greek U-23 Record of 20.56 seconds to beat Britain's James Alaka (The 2011 U23 champion in 100 metres).

International competitions

*: Did not finish in the semi-final.

Personal bests

References

External links

1990 births
Living people
Greek male sprinters
Athletes (track and field) at the 2012 Summer Olympics
Athletes (track and field) at the 2016 Summer Olympics
Olympic athletes of Greece
World Athletics Championships athletes for Greece
Mediterranean Games gold medalists for Greece
Athletes (track and field) at the 2013 Mediterranean Games
Mediterranean Games medalists in athletics
Sportspeople from Sparta, Peloponnese
21st-century Greek people